Michael Ledwith  (1874-1929) was a professional baseball player who played catcher in one game for the 1874 Brooklyn Atlantics.

References

External links

1929 deaths
Brooklyn Atlantics players
Major League Baseball catchers
19th-century baseball players
Albany M. N. Nolan players
New Bedford (minor league baseball) players
New Haven (minor league baseball) players
Hartford (minor league baseball) players
Springfield (minor league baseball) players
Baseball players from New York (state)
1874 births